Larry Harlow Kahn (born Lawrence Ira Kahn; March 20, 1939 – August 20, 2021) was an American salsa music performer, composer, and producer. He was born into a musical American family of Jewish descent.

Background

Summary
Harlow was born on March 20, 1939 in the Brownsville section of Brooklyn, the son of Rose (née Rose Sherman; 1910–1975) and Buddy Kahn (né Nathan Kahn; 1909–1981), and brother of Andy Harlow (né Andre H. Kahn; born 1945). In 1957 he graduated from Music & Arts High School. His mother was an opera singer with the stage name Rose Sherman in New York. His father was the bandleader at the Latin Quarter in New York under the name Buddy Harlowe. Harlow was affectionately nicknamed el Judio Maravilloso (The Marvelous Jew). Harlow was a noted salsa bandleader and multi-instrumentalist, although he primarily played piano. He produced over 260 albums for Fania Records as well as his manager and musician friend Chino Rodriguez two albums for Salsa Records and including his brother Andy's four albums on the Fania stable mate Vaya Records between 1972 and 1976: Sorpresa La Flauta, La Música Brava, El Campesino and Latin Fever. The first garnered a gold disc and spawned "La Lotería", the company's biggest selling 45 rpm release to date.

Music skills
Larry Harlow excelled at an early age at various instruments. The music and culture of New York's Latino community led him to Cuba where he began an intense study of Afro-Cuban music. Harlow, who is known for his innovative blend of Afro-Cuban and jazz styles of piano playing, studied music in the 1950s in Cuba but was unable to complete his degree before the Cuban Revolution forced him to leave the island in 1959. Larry and his orchestra, Orquesta Harlow, was the second orchestra signed to the Fania label. Harlow also produced over 106 albums for various artists and over 50 albums on his own besides the ones he produced for Fania. Larry Harlow continued to perform with Fania. Among his most popular albums were Abran Paso and Tributo a Arsenio Rodriguez with Ismael Miranda as the lead singer. Larry's opera Hommy (inspired by the Who's Tommy) was credited as integral to Celia Cruz's comeback (from an early retirement). In other firsts, Harlow was the first piano player for the legendary salsa group known as the Fania All-Stars, generally regarded as the seminal and most-important Salsa group to date, and Fania's first record producer. He also appeared with the Fania All-Stars in the movies Our Latin Thing (Nuestra Cosa), Live in Africa, and Salsa. One of the highlights of the film Our Latin Thing is the Orquesta Harlow 1971 performance of Abran Paso in front of an exuberant and dancing audience in East Harlem with a baby faced Ismael Miranda on vocals.

Contributions
Among Harlow's further contributions to music was his insistence on creation of a Latin Grammy Award (before the category merged in 2010 with less-specific Jazz ones. A year after the Trustees who oversee the Grammy Awards cut 31 categories in May 2011, they drew fierce protests from Latin jazz musician Bobby Sanabria, Chino Rodriguez, Carlos Santana, Paul Simon and Herbie Hancock among others, and the Grammys Trustees Board voted to reinstate the award for Best Latin Jazz Album in June 2012.) Larry Harlow's 1977 salsa suite La Raza Latina, an ambitious history of the Latin music musical genre created with singer/songwriter Rubén Blades, was nominated for a Grammy Award. Partially in recognition of his early efforts to establish the Latin Grammy categories (which for some years were awarded in a separate ceremony) as well as for his impressive career contributions to the tropical dance music genre (and Harlow's jazzified pianistic approach to it), in November 2008 Larry Harlow was presented with the Trustees Award by the Latin Recording Academy.

The Latin Legends Band a.k.a. Latin Legends of FANIA
In 1994, at the suggestion of his manager at the time Chino Rodriguez; Larry Harlow teamed up with Ray Barreto, Adalberto Santiago, and cuatro guitar virtuoso Yomo Toro to found the Latin Legends Band, with the aim of both educating Latino and American youth about Latin music heritage and pioneering new ideas in the music, resulting in Larry Harlow's Latin Legends of Fania Band 2006. This was an idea from Ray Barretto and Larry Harlow and the Latin Legends band continues to work around the world. With this same purpose he collaborated with David Gonzalez in ''Sofrito!'', a spicy stew of folk tales set to salsa, mambo, and jazz rhythms.

In 2005 he contributed to The Mars Volta's album Frances the Mute, on which he played a piano solo toward the end of "L'Via L'Viaquez." He also played piano with the group in some live shows.

Awards
Larry Harlow was inducted into the International Latin Music Hall of Fame in 2000 and was presented with the Beny Moré Memorial Award by the same organization in 2002. In 2008, Larry Harlow was presented with the Latin Grammy Trustees Award. He also received the Legacy Award at the 2016 La Musa Awards.

Larry Harlow held a BA in Music from Brooklyn College, City University of New York since 1963, and a master's degree in Philosophy from the New School of Social Research also in New York City.

Latter years and death
Prior to his death, Harlow resided in New York with his wife, and regularly continued to lead and perform with Larry Harlow and the Fania Latin Legends.

Harlow died in The Bronx on August 20, 2021, due to heart failure while hospitalized for a renal condition.

Discography

 Heavy Smokin' (Fania, 1965)
 Bajándote: Gettin' Off (Fania, 1966)
 El Exigente (Fania, 1967)
 Me and My Monkey (Fania, 1969)
 Ambergris! (Gatefold, 1970)
 Electric Harlow (Fania, 1970)
 Abran Paso! (Fania, 1971)
 Orchestra Harlow Presenta an Ismael Miranda (Fania, 1971)
 Tribute To Arsenio Rodríguez (Fania, 1971)
 Opportunidad (Fania, 1972) 
 Harlow's Harem (Fania, 1972)
 Hommy: A Latin Opera (Fania, 1973) 
 Salsa (Fania, 1974)
 Live in Quad (Fania, 1974)
 El Judío Maravilloso (Fania, 1975)
 Con Mi Viejo Amigo (Fania, 1976)
 El Jardinero del Amor (Fania, 1976)
 La Raza Latina: A Salsa Suite (Fania, 1977)
 El Albino Divino (Fania, 1978)
 Latin Fever (Fania, 1978) 
 Rumbambola (Fania, 1978)
 La Responsabilidad (with Fausto Rey) (Fania, 1979)
 El Dulce Aroma del Éxito (Fania, 1980)
 Our Latin Feeling (Nuestro Sentimiento) (Fania, 1980)
 Así Soy Yo (Coco, 1981)
 Yo Soy Latino (Fania, 1983)
 Señor Salsa (Tropical Budda, 1984)
 My Time Is Now/Mi Tiempo Llego (Cache Records 1990)
 The Latin Legends Band (Sony International, March 31, 1998)
 Romance En Salsa (Caimán, 1999)
 ¡Sofrito! (Rainart, 2000)
 Live at Birdland (Latin Cool, 2003)
 Passing The Torch vol.1 (With Marlow Rosado)(Big Label Records 2016)

Filmography

Our Latin Thing (Fania 1972)
Salsa (Fania, 1974)
Celia cruz and the Fania All Stars In Africa (Fania, 1993)
Live (Fania, 1995)
 Larry Harlow's Latin Legends of Fania (2006)
 Soul Power (2009)

Gallery

References

External links
Larry Harlow official website

More on Larry Harlow
Descarga.com interview
Salsa Central interview
Larry Harlow on Fania
Video interview with Larry Harlow
 
 

1939 births
2021 deaths
Avant-garde jazz musicians
Jazz fusion musicians
Musicians from Brooklyn
Jewish American jazz composers
American salsa musicians
Record producers from New York (state)
American music industry executives
Fania Records artists
Latin music record producers
Latin music composers
Brooklyn College alumni
Jazz musicians from New York (state)
21st-century American Jews
The High School of Music & Art alumni